Xiangli Subdistrict is a subdistrict in Sucheng District, Suqian, Jiangsu, China. , it has 10 residential communities under its administration.

See also 
 List of township-level divisions of Jiangsu

References 

Township-level divisions of Jiangsu
Suqian